The women's team foil competition in fencing at the 2012 Olympic Games in London was held on 2 August at the ExCeL Exhibition Centre.

Competition format
Nine teams competed in the women's team foil event. The draw was made considering the FIE rankings.

Schedule 
All times are British Summer Time (UTC+1)

Draw

Finals

Classification 5–8

Final classification

References

Results 

Women's team foil
2012 in women's fencing
Women's events at the 2012 Summer Olympics